Alien Youth is the fourth studio album by American Christian rock band Skillet. Developing their sound into hard-hitting industrial rock, it was released August 28, 2001 through Ardent Records. This was the first Skillet album to include  guitarist Ben Kasica, replacing Kevin Haaland. Kasica joined Skillet late in the recording process for the album, only recording guitars on "Earth Invasion". It peaked at No. 141 on the Billboard 200 and No. 16 on The Australian Christian Albums Chart.

Track listing
All songs written by John L. Cooper, except where noted.

Music video

The video for "Alien Youth" features the band in a futuristic city, wearing futuristic clothes much like those seen in the "Best Kept Secret" video. The opening shot is something coming down to earth. It then cuts to the futuristic city, circling around a tower with large screens at the top that display the album cover. The band is mostly shown playing in the middle of the city, with various shots of the individual band members being shown on large television screens. The video was shot on a green screen.

Credits 
Credits taken from the CD liner notes.

Skillet
 John Cooper – vocals, bass, sampling, programming
 Korey Cooper – keyboards, sampling, programming, backing vocals
 Kevin Haaland – guitars (1, 2, 4-12)
 Ben Kasica – guitars (3)
 Lori Peters – drums

Additional musicians
 Wendy Brookes – cello
 Nikki Frey – first violin 
 Teresa Pingitore – second violin 
 John Cooper, Korey Cooper, Christine Mundie and Jono Pingitore – group vocals (4)

Technical
 John L. Cooper – producer
 Skidd Mills – mixing (2, 3, 6), co-producer (3), engineer (3)
 Pete Matthews – engineer (1, 2, 4-12), mixing (1, 4, 7-12)
 Josh Horton – assistant engineer
 Jonathan Steitz – additional engineering, Pro Tools operator
 Scott Hull – mastering at Classic Sound (New York, NY)
 Allen Clark – photography 
 Maria Estes – make-up

Charts

DVD

Alien Youth: The Unplugged Invasion was Skillet's first DVD, released in 2002 by Ardent Records. They perform four songs from Alien Youth and one from Invincible as a mini acoustic concert. All of the instruments are unplugged (besides the keyboards) in place of acoustic guitar and softer drums. In addition, it includes the "Best Kept Secret" music video, a Bible Study from John Cooper, and a photo gallery of the unplugged performance.

Track listing
 "Alien Youth"
 "One Real Thing"
 "Kill Me, Heal Me"
 "You Are My Hope"
 "Best Kept Secret" (from Invincible)

References

2001 albums
Skillet (band) albums
Ardent Records albums